First Kill is a 2001 Dutch documentary film that revolves around the psychology of war. Important turning points in the Vietnam War are used to illustrate the effect of war on body and mind. The documentary consists of interviews with Michael Herr and several Vietnam veterans. The depth of the interviews provides insight into the feelings that accompany violence, fear, hate, seduction and pleasure.

First Kill was directed by Coco Schrijber and produced by Lemming Film.

External links

Dutch documentary films
2001 films
Documentary films about the Vietnam War
Documentary films about veterans
Documentary films about mental health
2001 documentary films
2000s English-language films